Mastax histrio is a species of beetle in the family Carabidae found in India, Pakistan and Sri Lanka.

References

Mastax histrio
Beetles of Asia
Beetles described in 1801